The 1960 European Figure Skating Championships was a figure skating competition sanctioned by the International Skating Union in which figure skaters competed for the title of European Champion in the disciplines of men's singles, ladies' singles, pair skating, and ice dancing. The competitions took place from February 4 to 7, 1960 in Garmisch-Partenkirchen, West Germany.

Results

Men

Judges were
 Hans Meixner 
 E. Skakala 
 J. Donnier 
 W. Stanek 
 Pamela Davis 
 M. Verdi 
 Christen Christensen 
 J. Creux 
 Tatiana Tolmacheva

Ladies

Judges were
 Oskar Madl 
 E. Skakala 
 J. Donnier 
 W. Stanek 
 P. L. Barrajo 
 Z. Balázs 
 M. Verdi 
 C. Benedict-Stieber 
 R. Steinmann

Pairs

Judges were
 E. Kucharz 
 E. Skakala 
 E. Bauch 
 A. Walker 
 J. Metlewicz 
 J. Creux 
 Tatiana Tolmacheva

Ice dancing

Judges were
 E. Kucharz 
 E. Skakala 
 J. Meudec 
 Hermann Schiechtl 
 P. Barrajo 
 G. Bozetti 
 Z. Balázs

References

Sources
 Result List provided by the ISU
 printed program of the Europeans

European Figure Skating Championships
European Figure Skating Championships
European Figure Skating Championships
1960 European Figure Skating Championships
International figure skating competitions hosted by West Germany
European Figure Skating Championships
European Figure Skating Championships
Sports competitions in Bavaria
Sport in Garmisch-Partenkirchen
1960s in Bavaria